Deborah Ann "Debbie" Cook (born January 22, 1954) is an American politician and lawyer from California. Cook was elected to the Huntington Beach City Council in 2000 and re-elected in 2004. She is president of the board of directors of the Post Carbon Institute.

Early life
On January 22, 1954, Cook was born in Corpus Christi, Texas. Cook's father is a military person with the United States Navy, who served in both World War II and the Korean War. Cook's grandfather was an Episcopal minister. Cook was baptized into the Episcopal Church by her grandfather. After Cook's father's retired from the Navy, the family moved to Cincinnati, Ohio.

In 1966, Cook and her family moved to California. Cook attended Corona del Mar High School in Newport Beach, California.

While attending high school, Cook became a runner-up in the Miss Newport Beach contest, earned a student pilot's license, completed an Outward Bound course and successfully climbed Mount Whitney.

Education 
Cook graduated from California State University, Long Beach where she studied earth science. Cook also has a J.D from Western State University College of Law.

In May 2005, Cook received an honorary Associate of Arts degree from Orange Coast College.

Career 
Cook coached and taught volleyball in Huntington Beach, and served as Parent Teacher Association president for Vista View School in Fountain Valley. In 1978 Debbie and John purchased a small office-equipment business which they ran for 14 years. During those years Cook obtained a patent for the business's shelving system.

As a political novice in 1990, Cook was the main force behind the Huntington Beach city voter initiative Measure C, a pro-environment City Charter amendment that forbids sale or lease of park or beach land without a citywide vote. Despite opposition by the city council majority being against the initiative, voters approved it.

In December 1994, Cook was admitted to the California bar. Cook served as attorney for the Bolsa Chica Land Trust, and took part in the efforts to preserve the Bolsa Chica Wetlands from development.

In 2000, Cook became a member of the city council for Huntington Beach, California.

In 2001 Cook became the mayor of Huntington Beach, California.

Cook was reelected in 2004. The office of the Mayor of Huntington Beach is a rotating position within the city council. She also has served as President of the Orange County Division of the League of California Cities, Chair of the League of California Cities Administrative Policy Committee and Chair of the Orange County Parks Commission. She helped lead the fight to prevent the Orange County Sanitation District from massive dumping of partially treated wastewater into the ocean. In 2007, Huntington Beach joined the U.S. Mayor's Agreement on Global Warming.cl

2008 campaign for Congress

On February 2, 2008, Debbie Cook announced her Democratic candidacy for California's 46th congressional district against incumbent Republican Dana Rohrabacher. Cook defeated Huntington Beach business owner Dan Kalmick in the June 3, 2008 primary for the Democratic nomination.

The Treasurer of the California Republican Party filed suit against Cook and the Orange County Registrar regarding Cook's ballot designation. The suit has been seen as frivolous and politically motivated. It was dismissed by the California Court of Appeals.

According to FEC reports, Cook outraised Rohrabacher in the first and second quarters of 2008, although Rohrabacher in total had raised $323,966 compared to Cook's $157,269 by the end of the second quarter 2008. In the end, Cook failed to oust the incumbent, winning only 42.4% of the vote to Rohrabacher's 53.2%.

Personal life 
On 1975, Cook married John Fisher. They have one son. In 1986, Cook and her family moved to Huntington Beach, California.

References

External links
 OC Voice Interview with Debbie Cook (Peak Oil)
 SCAG Energy Summit: Debbie Cook 
  Congress candidate sued for using "Mayor" on ballot.

1954 births
Living people
California State University, Long Beach alumni
California Democrats
Mayors of Huntington Beach, California
California lawyers
People from Westminster, California
Western State University College of Law alumni
American women lawyers
21st-century American women